Diacritics is a quarterly peer-reviewed academic journal established in 1971 at Cornell University and published by the Johns Hopkins University Press. Articles serve to review recent literature in the field of literary criticism, and have covered topics in gender studies, political theory, psychoanalysis, queer theory, and other areas. The editor-in-chief is Karen Pinkus (Cornell University).

External links 
 

Cornell University academic journals
Literary magazines published in the United States
Publications established in 1971
Johns Hopkins University Press academic journals
English-language journals
Literary criticism
Quarterly journals
1971 establishments in New York (state)